In Euclidean geometry, Moss's egg is an oval made by smoothly connecting four circular arcs. It can be constructed from a right isosceles triangle ABC with apex C.

To construct Moss's egg:
Draw a semicircle on the base AB of the triangle, outside of the triangle.
Connect it to a circular arc centered at B from A to a point D on line BC, and by another circular arc centered at A from B to a point E on line AC. 
Complete the oval by a circular arc centered at C, from D to E.

References

External links

Video: How to draw an egg, The Aperiodical

Piecewise-circular curves